Forkhead box protein G1 is a protein that in humans is encoded by the FOXG1 gene.

Function 

This gene belongs to the forkhead family of transcription factors that is characterized by a distinct forkhead domain. The complete function of this gene has not yet been determined; however, it has been shown to play a role in the development of the brain and telencephalon.  Mutations of FOXG1 are the cause of FoxG1 Syndrome.

FOXG1 syndrome
FoxG1 Syndrome is characterized by microcephaly and brain malformations. It affects most aspects of development and can cause seizures. FOXG1 syndrome is classified as an autism spectrum disorder and was previously considered a variant of Rett syndrome.

Interactions 

FOXG1 has been shown to interact with JARID1B.

See also 
 FOX proteins

References

Further reading

External links 
 FOXG1 Research Foundation Info on FOXG1 Syndrome
 

Forkhead transcription factors